Hindu units of time are described in Hindu texts ranging from microseconds to trillions of years, including cycles of cosmic time that repeat general events in Hindu cosmology. Time is described as eternal. Various fragments of time are described in the Vedas, Manusmriti, Bhagavata Purana, Vishnu Purana, Mahabharata, Surya Siddhanta etc.

Sidereal metrics

Sidereal astrology maintains the alignment between signs and constellations via corrective systems of Hindu (Vedic)-origin known as ayanamsas (Sanskrit: 'ayana' "movement" + 'aṃśa "component"), to allow for the observed precession of equinoxes, whereas tropical astrology ignores precession. This has caused the two systems, which were aligned around 2,000 years ago, to drift apart over the centuries.

Ayanamsa systems used in Hindu astrology (also known as Vedic astrology) include the Lahiriayanamsa and the Raman ayanamsa. The Fagan-Bradley ayanamsa is an example of an ayanamsa system used in Western sidereal astrology. As of 2020, sun signs calculated using the Sri Yukteswar ayanamsa were around 23 degrees behind tropical sun signs. Per these calculations, persons born between March 12 - April 12, for instance, would have the sun sign of Pisces. By contrast, persons born between March 21 - April 19 would have the sun sign of Aries per tropical calculations.

Sidereal Units:

According to :

Small units of time used in the Vedas:

Lunar metrics

Consists of the following:

Tropical metrics

Consists of the following:

Cosmic metrics

The table below contains calculations of cosmic Hindu units of time as experienced by different entities, namely humans, Pitris (forefathers), Devas (gods), Manu (progenitor of humanity), and Brahma (creator god). Calculations use a traditional 360-day year (twelve 30-day months) and a standard 24-hour day for all entities.

Lifespans
Hindu texts define lifespans differently for humans, Pitris (forefathers), Devas (gods), Manus (progenitors of mankind), and Brahma (creator god). The division of a year for each is twelve 30-day months or 360 days, where a day is divided into a 12-hour day proper and 12-hour night. A 30-day month amounts to four 7-day weeks with an extra 8th day every two weeks (48-week year). A traditional human year is measured by the sun's northern (uttarayana) and southern (dakshinayana) movements in the sky, where the new year commences only when the sun returns to the same starting point and a pause on the commencement otherwise. Ebenezer Burgess postulates an intercalary month was inserted every five years to anciently maintain the correspondence of the 360-day years with the true solar years (~365.24-day years). For this reason, a traditional 360-day year is equivalent to a modern ~365.24-day solar or tropical year.

Cosmic date

According to Puranic sources, Krishna's departure marks the end of the human age of Dvapara-yuga and the start of Kali-yuga, which is dated to midnight on 17/18 February 3102BCE of the proleptic Julian calendar. We are currently halfway through Brahma's life (maha-kalpa), whose lifespan is equal to the duration of the manifested material elements, from which Brahma manifests his universe in kalpa cycles:
 51st year of 100 (2nd half or parardha)
 1st month of 12
 1st kalpa (Shveta-Varaha Kalpa) of 30
 7th manvantara (Vaivasvatha Manu) of 14
 28th chatur-yuga of 71
 4th yuga (Kali-yuga) of 4

A maha-kalpa is followed by a maha-pralaya (full dissolution) of equal length. Each kalpa (day of Brahma) is followed by a pralaya (night of Brahma or partial dissolution) of equal length. Preceding the first and following each manvantara is a manvantara-sandhya (connection period), each with a length of Krita-yuga ( Satya-yuga).

Hindu texts specify that the start and end of each of the yugas are marked by astronomical alignments. This cycle's Treta-yuga began with 5 planets residing in the "Aries" constellation. This cycle's Dvapara-yuga ended with the "Saptarshi" constellation (Ursa major) residing in the "Magha" constellation. The current Kali-yuga will end with the Sun, Moon and Jupiter residing in the "Pushya" sector.

Human

The history of humanity is divided up into four yugas ( dharmic ages or world ages)— (pronounced Krita-yuga;  Satya-yuga),  and Kali-yuga—each with a 25% decline in dharmic practices and length, giving proportions (pronounced charanas) of 4:3:2:1 (e.g. Satya: 100% start; Kali: 25% start, 0% end), indicating a de-evolution in spiritual consciousness and an evolution in material consciousness. Lengths are given in divine years ( celestial or Deva years), where a divine year lasts for 360 solar (human) years. A chatur-yuga lasts for 4.32 million solar (12,000 divine) years with 1,728,000 years of Krita-yuga, 1,296,000 years of Treta-yuga, 864,000 years of Dvapara-yuga, and 432,000 years of Kali-yuga.

Current yuga
Kali-yuga lasts for 432,000 years and is the 4th of 4 yugas in a cycle as well as the current yuga, with two sandhyas, each lasting for 36,000 years:
 Kali-yuga started 3102BCE in past:
 = current year + Kali-yuga start year - year zero
 =  + 3102 - 1
 =  years
 Kali-yuga-sandhya (dawn) ends CE in future:
 = Kali-yuga-sandhya - elapsed Kali-yuga
 = 36,000 - ( + 3102 - 1)
 =  years
 Kali-yuga-sandhyamsa (dusk) starts CE in future:
 = Kali-yuga - Kali-yuga-sandhyamsa - elapsed Kali-yuga
 = 432,000 - 36,000 - ( + 3102 - 1)
 =  years
 Kali-yuga ends CE in future:
 = Kali-yuga - elapsed Kali-yuga
 = 432,000 - ( + 3102 - 1)
 =  years

Current chatur yuga
A chatur-yuga lasts for 4.32million years, where the current is the 28th of 71:
 Started BCE in past:
 = chatur-yuga - Kali-yuga + elapsed Kali-yuga
 = 4,320,000 - 432,000 + ( + 3102 - 1)
 =  years
 ≈  million years
 Ends CE in future:
 = Kali-yuga - elapsed Kali-yuga
 = 432,000 - ( + 3102 - 1)
 =  years

Pitri
The lifespan of the Pitris (forefathers) lasts for 100 of their years.
 24 hours (1 day & night) of Pitris = 1 solar month (masa; Moon's two 15-day fortnights: bright and dark)
 30 days (1 month) of Pitris = 30 solar months (2.5 solar years)
 12 months (1 year) of Pitris = 30 solar years (1 month of Devas)
 100 years (lifespan) of Pitris = 3,000 solar years

Deva
The lifespan of the Devas (gods) lasts for 100 of their years.
 24 hours (1 day & night) of Devas = 1 solar year (Sun's two 180-day motions: northern and southern)
 30 days (1 month) of Devas = 30 solar years (1 year of Pitris)
 12 months (1 year) of Devas = 360 solar years
 100 years (lifespan) of Devas = 36,000 solar years

Manu

The lifespan of the Manus (progenitors of mankind) lasts for 100 of their years. Each Manu reigns over a period called a manvantara, each lasting for 71 chatur-yugas (306.72 million years). A total of 14 Manus reign successively in one kalpa (day of Brahma). During each  ( manvantara-sandhi), Earth (Bhu-loka) is submerged in water.
 24 hours (1 day & night) of Manu = 8,520 solar years
 30 days (1 month) of Manu = 255,600 solar years
 12 months (1 year) of Manu = 3,067,200 solar years
 100 years (lifespan) of Manu = 306,720,000 solar years (71 chatur-yugas)

Current manvantara
A manvantara lasts for 306.72million years, where the current (ruled by Vaivasvatha Manu) is the 7th of 14:
 Started in past:
 = elapsed 28th chatur-yuga + 27 chatur-yugas
 = chatur-yuga - Kali-yuga + elapsed Kali-yuga + 27 chatur-yugas
 = (4,320,000 - 432,000 + ( + 3102 - 1)) + 4,320,000 * 27
 =  years
 ≈  million years
 Ends in future:
 = remaining 28th chatur-yuga + 43 chatur-yugas
 = Kali-yuga - elapsed Kali-yuga + 43 chatur-yugas
 = (432,000 - ( + 3102 - 1)) + 4,320,000 * 43
 =  years
 ≈  million years

Brahma

The lifespan of Brahma (creator god) lasts for 100 of his years. His 12-hour day or kalpa ( day of Brahma) is followed by a 12-hour night or pralaya ( night of Brahma) of equal length, each lasting for 4.32 billion years. A kalpa lasts for 1,000 chatur-yugas and has 14 manvantaras and 15 manvantara-sandhyas occurring in it. At the start of Brahma's days, he is re-born and creates the planets and the first living entities. At the end of his days, he and his creations are unmanifest (partial dissolution). His 100-year life is divided into two 50-year periods, each called a '''. In 100 360-day years (maha-kalpa), there are a total of 36,000 full days: 36,000 kalpas (days proper) and 36,000 pralayas (nights).

 12 hours (1 day proper: kalpa) of Brahma = 4.32 billion solar years (1,000 chatur-yugas; 14 manvantaras + 15 manvantara-sandhyas)
 24 hours (1 day & night: kalpa + pralaya) of Brahma = 8.64 billion solar years
 30 days (1 month) of Brahma = 259.2 billion solar years
 12 months (1 year) of Brahma = 3.1104 trillion solar years
 50 years (parardha) of Brahma = 155.52 trillion solar years
 100 years (lifespan: 2 parardhas) of Brahma = 311.04 trillion solar years

Current kalpa

A kalpa (day of Brahma, 12 hours) lasts for 4.32billion years, where the current (Shveta-Varaha Kalpa) is the 1st of 30 in his 1st month of his 51st year:
 Started in past:
 = elapsed 7th manvantara + 7 manvantara-sandhyas + 6 manvantaras = elapsed 28th chatur-yuga + 27 chatur-yugas + 7 manvantara-sandhyas + 6 manvantaras = chatur-yuga - Kali-yuga + elapsed Kali-yuga + 27 chatur-yugas + 7 manvantara-sandhyas + 6 manvantaras = ((4,320,000 - 432,000 + ( + 3102 - 1)) + 4,320,000 * 27) + 1,728,000 * 7 + 306,720,000 * 6
 =  years
 ≈  billion years
 Ends in future:
 = remaining 7th manvantara + 8 manvantara-sandhyas + 7 manvantaras = remaining 28th chatur-yuga + 43 chatur-yugas + 8 manvantara-sandhyas + 7 manvantaras = Kali-yuga - elapsed Kali-yuga + 43 chatur-yugas + 8 manvantara-sandhyas + 7 manvantaras = ((432,000 - ( + 3102 - 1)) + 4,320,000 * 43) + 1,728,000 * 8 + 306,720,000 * 7
 =  years
 ≈  billion years

Current maha kalpa
A maha-kalpa (life of Brahma) lasts for 311.04trillion years:
 Started in past:
 = elapsed 18,001st kalpa + 18,000 kalpas + 18,000 pralayas = elapsed 7th manvantara + 7 manvantara-sandhyas + 6 manvantaras + 36,000 kalpas/pralayas = elapsed 28th chatur-yuga + 27 chatur-yugas + 7 manvantara-sandhyas + 6 manvantaras + 36,000 kalpas/pralayas = chatur-yuga - Kali-yuga + elapsed Kali-yuga + 27 chatur-yugas + 7 manvantara-sandhyas + 6 manvantaras + 36,000 kalpas/pralayas = (((4,320,000 - 432,000 + ( + 3102 - 1)) + 4,320,000 * 27) + 1,728,000 * 7 + 306,720,000 * 6) + 4,320,000,000 * 36,000
 =  years 
 ≈  trillion years
 Ends in future:
 = remaining 18,001st kalpa + 17,999 kalpas + 18,000 pralayas = remaining 7th manvantara + 8 manvantara-sandhyas + 7 manvantaras + 35,999 kalpas/pralayas = remaining 28th chatur-yuga + 43 chatur-yugas + 8 manvantara-sandhyas + 7 manvantaras + 35,999 kalpas/pralayas = Kali-yuga - elapsed Kali-yuga + 43 chatur-yugas + 8 manvantara-sandhyas + 7 manvantaras + 35,999 kalpas/pralayas = (((432,000 - ( + 3102 - 1)) + 4,320,000 * 43) + 1,728,000 * 8 + 306,720,000 * 7) + 4,320,000,000 * 35,999
 =  years 
 ≈  trillion years

Hindu texts
Mahabharata
The Mahabharata (12.231.12–31) describes units of time from a wink of the eye (nimesha) up to the days (kalpa) and nights (pralaya) of Brahma.

Manusmriti
The Manusmriti ( Laws of Manu; 1.64–80) describes units of time from a twinkling of the eye (nimesha) up to the days (kalpa) and nights (pralaya) of Brahma.

According to Patrick Olivelle, most scholars take the table of contents (1.111–118) to be an addition, but for him the account of time and cosmology (1.61–86) to the aforementioned (1.118) are out of place redactions. He feels the narrative should have ended when the initial command to "listen" (1.4) was repeated (1.60), then transition to "learn" (2.1).

Georg Bühler, whose translation has remained the standard for over a century according to Olivelle, translated 1.71 as 12,000 years in a four-aged period, same as Sir William Jones's translation, both based on Kulluka Bhatta's commentary. Medhatithi translated it as 12,000 four-aged periods in an age of the gods. Kulluka and Olivelle reject Medhatithi's interpretation based on 1.79 mentioning 12,000 without a qualifier ("etat" or "this") and must be assumed as years.

Surya Siddhanta
The Surya Siddhanta (1.10–21) describes units of time from a respiration (prana) up to the 100-year lifespan of Brahma (maha-kalpa'').

See also

Notes

References

External links
 Scientific Explanation of Hindu Time Units
 Surya Siddhanta, Chapter I with Commentary and Illustrations

Hindu astronomy
History of mathematics
Vedic period
Hindu philosophical concepts
Obsolete units of measurement
Units of time
Hindu calendar
Units of measurement by country
Time in India
Time in Nepal